The 2010 AAA 400 was a NASCAR Sprint Cup Series stock car race held on September 26, 2010, at Dover International Speedway in Dover, Delaware. The 400 lap race was the twenty-eighth in the 2010 NASCAR Sprint Cup Series, as well as the second race in the ten-race Chase for the Sprint Cup, which ends the season. The race was won by Jimmie Johnson, of the Hendrick Motorsports team. Jeff Burton finished second, and Joey Logano, who started nineteenth, clinched third.

Pole position driver Jimmie Johnson maintained his lead on the first lap to begin the race, as A. J. Allmendinger, who started in the second position on the grid, remained behind him. Fourteen laps later Allmendinger became the leader of the race. Chase for the Sprint Cup participants Clint Bowyer, and Tony Stewart were in the top ten for most of the race, but in the closing laps all of them suffered spins or other problems. Afterward, Johnson became the leader of the race, once Allmendinger made a pit stop because of a loose wheel. Johnson maintained the first position to lead the most laps of 191, and to win his sixth race of the season.

There were four cautions and eighteen lead changes among ten different drivers throughout the course of the race. It was Jimmie Johnson's sixth win in the 2010 season, and the fifty-third of his career. The result moved Johnson up to second in the Drivers' Championship, thirty-five points behind Denny Hamlin and ten ahead of Kyle Busch. Chevrolet maintained its lead in the Manufacturers' Championship, thirty-five ahead of Toyota and eighty ahead of Ford, with eight races remaining in the season. A total of 88,000 people attended the race, while 3.966 million watched it on television.

Report

Background 

Dover International Speedway is one of five short tracks to hold NASCAR races; the others are Bristol Motor Speedway, Richmond International Raceway, Martinsville Speedway, and Phoenix International Raceway. The track's turns are banked at twenty-four degrees. The front stretch, the location of the finish line, is banked at nine degrees with the backstretch. The racetrack has seats for 135,000 spectators.

Before the race, Denny Hamlin led the Drivers' Championship with 5,230 points, and Kevin Harvick stood in second with 5,185. Kyle Busch was third in the Drivers' Championship with 5,168, thirteen ahead of Jeff Gordon and twenty-four ahead of Kurt Busch in fourth and fifth. Jimmie Johnson with 5,138 was three points ahead of Carl Edwards, as Greg Biffle with 5,122 points, was four ahead of Jeff Burton, and sixteen in front of Tony Stewart. Matt Kenseth and Clint Bowyer was eleventh and twelfth with 5,094 and 5,045 points. In the Manufacturers' Championship, Chevrolet was leading with 197 points, thirty-two points ahead of their rival Toyota. Ford, with 123 points, was fourteen points ahead of Dodge in the battle for third. Jimmie Johnson was the race's defending champion.

Practice and qualifying 
Three practice sessions were held before the Sunday race—one on Friday, and two on Saturday. The first session lasted 90 minutes, while the second session lasted 45 minutes. The third and final session lasted 60 minutes. During the first practice session, Ryan Newman, for the Stewart Haas Racing team, was quickest ahead of Carl Edwards in second and Kasey Kahne in the third position. Clint Bowyer was scored fourth and Greg Biffle managed fifth. Matt Kenseth, Kyle Busch, A. J. Allmendinger, Mark Martin, and Jeff Gordon rounded out the top ten quickest drivers in the session.

Forty-five cars were entered for qualifying, but only forty-three could race because of NASCAR's qualifying procedure. Jimmie Johnson clinched his twenty-fifth pole position in the Sprint Cup Series, with a time of 23.116 seconds. He was joined on the front row of the grid by A. J. Allmendinger. Mark Martin qualified third, Martin Truex Jr. took fourth, and Denny Hamlin started fifth. Tony Stewart, one of the drivers in the Chase for the Sprint Cup, qualified twenty-sixth, while Kevin Harvick was scored thirty-fourth. The three drivers that failed to qualify for the race were Ted Musgrave, Josh Wise, and Jeff Green. Once the qualifying session ended, Johnson said, "This is certainly a step in the right direction for momentum. Last weekend, we ran much better than where we finished. It stinks that we finished where we did, but there is nothing we can really do about it." Mark Martin, who originally qualified third, started forty-second, after having his time disallowed where the right rear shock exceeded the maximum allowable gas pressure.

On the next morning, David Reutimann was quickest in the second practice session, ahead of Kyle Busch and Kurt Busch in second and third. Juan Pablo Montoya was fourth quickest, and Jimmie Johnson took fifth. Greg Biffle, Clint Bowyer, Jamie McMurray, Jeff Burton, and Jeff Gordon followed in the top-ten. Other drivers in the chase, such as Carl Edwards, was twentieth, and Kevin Harvick, who was twenty-sixth. During the third, and final practice session, Joey Logano, with a fastest time of 23.802, was quickest. Clint Bowyer and Jeff Burton followed in second and third with times of 23.844 and 23.851 seconds. Matt Kenseth managed to be fourth fastest, ahead of Martin Truex Jr. and Marcos Ambrose. Denny Hamlin was scored seventh, Jimmie Johnson took eighth, A. J. Allmendinger was ninth, and Brad Keselowski.

During the third practice session, Denny Hamlin and Kevin Harvick collided with each other. Once they both drove to the garage, they were talking out of anger from the comments that Denny Hamlin had about Clint Bowyer's penalty after New Hampshire. Once the argument ended, Denny Hamlin stated, "There really was just a lot of cursing. That's all that was being said. There was really nothing logical being said between the two teams." Richard Childress, the owner of the Bowyer's racecar, commented, "When you're talking about comments, you can't win a pissing match with a skunk. There are two things I've learned. One thing is that. The other is that you don't throw stones if you live in a glass house." Afterward, Robin Pemberton commented about the collision by saying, "They just got together in practice, and that's fine. Sometimes you get together in practice like that."

Race 
The race, the twenty-eighth out of a total of thirty-six in the season, began at 1:00 p.m. EDT and was televised live in the United States on ESPN. Dan Schafer, pastor of Calvary Assembly of God in Hightstown, New Jersey, began pre-race ceremonies, by giving the invocation. Next, Mercury recording artist Jessie James performed the national anthem, and Marke Dickinson, senior vice president of AAA Mid-Atlantic, gave the command for drivers to start their engines.

Jimmie Johnson retained his pole position lead into the first corner, followed by A. J. Allmendinger in the second position. Denny Hamlin, who started fourth, had fallen into fifth by the second lap. One lap later, Juan Pablo Montoya moved into fourth, as Ryan Newman emerged in twelfth. After the seventh lap, Johnson remained in first, as Jeff Gordon moved into thirteenth. Allmendinger emerged in first after passing Johnson on lap 14. Mark Martin had gained the most positions, with eleven, by the eighteenth lap. On lap 23, Allmendinger remained the leader ahead of Johnson and Martin Truex Jr. Allmendinger began putting other drivers a lap behind by lap 24, with Mike Bliss. After 28 consecutive laps under the green flag, Allmendinger was 1.2 second ahead of Johnson in the second position. Joe Nemechek was put a lap down on lap 31; Bobby Labonte followed Nemechek six laps later.

Allmendinger's lead of 1.2 seconds was reduced to nothing when the pace car was on track for the first caution. It was given because a cover for one of a caution light's cover had loosened. When the drivers made pit stops, Allmendinger remained the leader, but Johnson lost three positions, falling to fifth. Tony Stewart was the only team to change only two tires, which resulted him to move toward the front of the grid. However, once the race resumed he was losing positions quickly. Gordon, who started fifteenth, had gained seven positions to eighth by lap 47. The second caution followed three laps later because David Reutimann collided into the wall after contact from Newman. Reutimann's car sustained only minor damages. Kevin Harvick went to pit road under the caution, in which afterward his rear tire changer fell and hurt his wrist. Allmendinger led on the restart, ahead of Martin Truex Jr. in second. On lap 61, Montoya moved into the third position after passing Greg Biffle.

Johnson followed Montoya, by passing Biffle one lap later for fourth. After the sixty-sixth lap, Allmendinger had led more laps in the race so far than his 107 previous starts. Joey Logano, after starting nineteenth had moved to twelfth by lap 68. Five laps later, Hamlin fell to the eighth position. Stewart, who chose only two tire changes on his first pit stop, had fallen to twentieth after eighty laps. By lap 85, Allmendinger had a 2.9 second lead over Martin Truex Jr. Afterward, Scott Speed was put a lap down and Kurt Busch moved to the fifth spot. On lap 93, Johnson emerged in second after passing Montoya and Truex. Five laps later, Casey Mears went a lap down after Allmendinger passed him. After 104 laps, Carl Edwards rounded out the top-ten positions.

Eight laps later, Allmendinger began green flag pit stops. Truex became the new leader, followed by Logano, Reed Sorenson, and Labonte. On lap 122, Allmendinger reclaimed the first position and extended his lead to over five seconds. On lap 138, Edwards moved to ninth while Truex remained second. Montoya maintained the seventh position until 145, when Edwards passed him. After 147 laps, Hamlin was running in sixth, and Jeff Gordon was tenth. By lap 155, Allmendinger had a 4.3 lead over second place. Clint Bowyer collided with the wall three laps later, and only sustained side damage. On lap 162, Johnson claimed the second position from Truex. Ten laps later, Johnson reclaimed the lead after Allmendinger fell to 27th while making a pit stop. On lap 186, the third caution was given when Matt Kenseth gathered damage from a flat tire because of missing the entrance of pit road. Johnson maintained the first position under the pit stops, ahead of Truex and Kyle Busch. One lap later, Gordon moved into third, as Hamlin fell to sixth.

On lap 202, Kyle Busch reclaimed third away from Gordon. Truex had a loose wheel after pit stops, resulting in him coming to pit road. Once his pit stop completed, his rear axle broke. Edwards, then, passed Gordon for fifth, as Jeff Burton moved into fourth. On lap 219, Gordon had fallen to sixth while his teammate Jimmie Johnson had led sixty-four laps to this point in the race. After 230 laps, there were only nineteen drivers on the same lap as Johnson. Five laps later, Edwards passed Jeff Burton to move into fourth. Afterward, Paul Menard passed Jamie McMurray for the tenth position. By the 249th lap, Johnson had a 3.21 second lead, ahead of Kyle Busch, who collided with the wall once lap later. On lap 266, another set of green flag pit stops began. Afterward, Johnson led Kyle Busch by 1.95 seconds. On lap 290, debris prompted the fourth caution of the race. Kyle Busch passed Johnson during pit stops to lead on the restart.

Two laps later, Logano passed Johnson for the second position. On lap 299, Kyle Busch had a 1.36 second lead over second place. Three laps later, Paul Menard moved into the seventh position while Kurt Busch challenged Jeff Burton for fourth. Johnson then moved into second after passing Logano on lap 320. Less than five laps later, Kevin Harvick complained to his crew about his car handling problems. Allmendinger, after his unscheduled pit stop earlier in the race, had moved up to tenth by lap 330. Seven laps later, Johnson reclaimed the first position from Kyle Busch. Afterward, Jeff Burton moved into the third position. Burton, then passed Kyle Busch for second seven laps later. By the 349th lap, Johnson has a 1.23 second lead over Burton, as Harvick made a pit stop. On lap 360, more green flag pit stops began, as Hamlin and Gordon made pit stops. Three laps later, Johnson made a pit stop, giving the lead to Edwards who subsequently made a pit stop himself, returning the lead to Johnson. On lap 371, McMurray moved into eleventh after Sam Hornish Jr.'s car ignited on pit road. Johnson had a lead of 2.37 seconds over Burton after pit stops ended. Jimmie Johnson maintained the lead to win his sixth race of the 2010 season. Jeff Burton finished second, ahead of Joey Logano in third and Kurt Busch in fourth. Carl Edwards clinched the fifth position, after starting tenth.

Post-race 

Jimmie Johnson appeared in victory lane after his victory lap to start celebrating his sixth win of the season, in front of a crowd of 88,000 people. Afterward, his crew chief, Chad Knaus said, "We really had our hands full this weekend." He continued with, "We came in qualifying trim, and as we unloaded, the car wasn’t reacting the way we anticipated. So we had to make some pretty significant changes, and when it came time to qualify, we had to put a setup under there that Jimmie hadn’t felt yet. For race practice, we weren’t where we needed to be then either. Honestly, we could adjust the car and make it do some different things, but we couldn’t really make the car better. The difference today was definitely the driver."

"It was a mediocre day. I hate that we didn’t run better, but we got close to where we wanted to be leaving Dover. It’s frustrating that we still can’t get a grasp on this race track and didn’t run as well as we did in the spring. But if you told me I’d be taking a 35 point lead out of Dover, I’d take it," said ninth-place finisher, Denny Hamlin. Next, Jeff Burton, who finished second, said:

Hamlin maintained the Drivers' championship lead with 5,368 points. Johnson stood in second, thirty five points behind Hamlin, and ten ahead of Kyle Busch. Kurt Busch, after finishing fourth in the race, remained in the fourth position with 5,309 points. Kevin Harvick was fifth, as Carl Edwards, Burton, Jeff Gordon, Greg Biffle, and Tony Stewart followed in the top-ten positions. The final two positions available in the Chase for the Sprint Cup was occupied with Matt Kenseth in eleventh and Clint Bowyer in twelfth. In the Manufacturers' Championship, Chevrolet maintained their lead with 206 points. Toyota remained second with 171 points. Ford followed with 126 points, thirteen points ahead of Dodge in fourth. 3.966 million people watched the race on television. The race took three hours, two minutes and twenty-seven seconds to complete, and the margin of victory was 2.637 seconds.

Results

Qualifying

Race results

Standings after the race 

Drivers' Championship standings

Manufacturers' Championship standings

Note: Only the top twelve positions are included for the driver standings. These drivers qualified for the Chase for the Sprint Cup.

References 

AAA 400
AAA 400
NASCAR races at Dover Motor Speedway